The Bremen-Vegesack – Bremen railway line connects the northern parts of Bremen with the city centre. The line shares its tracks with the Bremen-Bremerhaven railway line between Bremen-Burg and Bremen Hauptbahnhof.

The line mostly carries commuter trains; RegionalBahn double deck trains in push-pull operation with Class 111 engines run in 30-minute intervals on the line. Some trains continue past Bremen Hauptbahnhof toward Verden.

Railway lines in Bremen
1862 establishments in Germany